Anton Aleksandrovich Ivanov (born 2 February 1985), is a Turkmen–Russian politician who was the Head of Belgorod from 21 December 2021 to 31 October 2022.

Biography
Anton Ivanov was born on 2 February 1985 in Mary, Turkmen Soviet Socialist Republic, in the Soviet Union. In 2007, he graduated from the Law Institute of Belgorod State University, in 2008 - the Institute of Economics and Management of Belgorod Technological University.

From 2014 to 2016, he worked in the administration of Belgorodsky District as deputy head of the construction, transport, housing and communal services and engineering infrastructure committee, and in 2017 he became the first deputy head of the construction and transport department of Belgorod Oblast. From 2018 to 2021, he was the General Director of JSC "Belgorod Mortgage Corporation" and the State Unitary Enterprise "Fund for Support of IZHS of the Belgorod Oblast".

On 11 October 2021, Ivanov headed the office of the administration of Belgorod, and on 13 October, he was appointed the First Deputy Mayor of Belgorod. On 21 December 2021, Ivanov was elected by the deputies of the Belgorod City Council as the 7th head of the administration of Belgorod.

References

1985 births
Living people
Mayors of places in Russia
People from Mary, Turkmenistan